S30 may refer to:

Automobiles 
 Aeolus S30, a Chinese sedan
 Jinbei S30, a Chinese SUV
 Nissan S30, a Japanese sport car
 Toyota Crown (S30), a Japanese sedan

Aviation 
 Blériot-SPAD S.30, a French sport aircraft
 Lebanon State Airport, in Linn County, Oregon, United States
 SABCA S-30, a Belgian light aircraft
 Short S.30 Empire, a British flying boat
 Sikorsky S-30, a proposed American biplane transport

Electronics 
 Canon PowerShot S30, a digital camera
 Samsung M810 Instinct S30, a mobile phone
 Series 30, a mobile phone software platform

Rail and transit 
 S30 (RER Fribourg), a regional rail line in Fibourg, Switzerland
 S30 (TILO), a regional railway service in Ticino, Switzerland
 S30 (ZVV), a railway line in Zürich, Switzerland
 Kuromatsunai Station, in Suttsu District, Hokkaido, Japan

Ships and boats 
 S 30 (keelboat), a sailboat class
 
 , a submarine of the Royal Navy
 , a submarine of the United States Navy

Other uses 
 40S ribosomal protein S30
 County Route S30 (California)
 County Route S30 (Bergen County, New Jersey)
 S30: Never add water to this product, a safety phrase in chemistry
 Sulfur-30, an isotope of sulfur